The Metro-North Railroad is a commuter railroad serving northern suburbs of New York City. It principally uses a fleet of electric railcars for its services; diesel locomotives and push-pull coaches are in use as well for non-electrified portions of the system.

History
When the Metropolitan Transportation Authority began to subsidize commuter rail systems of Penn Central Railroad and Erie Lackawanna Railway in the early-1970s, they inherited equipment of the former New York Central Railroad, Pennsylvania Railroad, New York, New Haven, and Hartford Railroad and Erie-Lackawanna Railroad, some of which dated back to the early 20th Century. However, they also began to operate variations of the new M1 railcar which was designated as the "M1A." The next new fleet of EMUs came with the M2s, which replaced Pullman 4400-series cars dating back to the early 1920s to 1954 from 1973 to 1977. With the expansion of electrified territory, 142 M3As were ordered, arriving between 1984 and 1986. Two additional small orders would supplement the existing fleet; 54 M4s arrived in late 1987, and in 1994 48 M6s arrived. Many diesel locomotives inherited from those railroads, however, were used as recently as the early 21st Century. The M1As were replaced between 2004 and 2007 with the arrival of the 336 M7As. In order to replace the M2, M4, and M6s on the New Haven Line and to respond to increasing ridership on that line 405 M8s were ordered. In 2016, in response to ridership higher than initially expected on the New Haven Line, up to 94 additional M8s will be built to meet that line's needs.

Active rolling stock

Locomotives

Future locomotives

In July 2018, Metro-North Rail Commuter Council Vice Chairman Orrin Getz announced the agency's intention to purchase 15 new Siemens Charger SC-44 locomotives to replace the current locomotive fleet for the Port Jervis Line.

In December 2020, Metro-North board approved a Federal Transit Administration funded $334.9 Million contract for Siemens to manufacture and test 19 Dual-Mode locomotives with an option for an additional 8 more. 19 of the 27 Dual-Mode Locomotives ordered have already been fully approved for $231.6 Million with the other 8 costing $82.1 Million. In addition the contract also includes capital spare parts for $12.9 Million, a training simulator for $1.5 Million, Branch test Equipment for $3.0 Million, and extended warranty for 3.6 Million. This contract includes 144 in total option locomotives with 66 additional locomotives for Long Island Railroad in an alternate configuration, 32 additional locomotives for Metro-North, 20 for  the Connecticut Department of Transportation, and 26 locomotives in an alternate configuration for Amtrak/NYSDOT. These dual modes would be able to work on both Amtrak and Metro-North signal systems and will be able to sustain 110 miles per hour in service. These units do not have a specific variation name yet but will be a variant of the SC-44 Charger.

Push-pull coaches 
These cars are non-powered.

Electric multiple units
M3A and M7A cars draw power from 650 V DC third rail with under-running contact shoes. M8 draw power from third rail, both over- and under-running, or 12.5 kV 60 Hz and 25 kV 60 Hz AC catenary.

Possible future electric multiple units

MTA originally planned to order 188 M9A cars for Metro-North as part of the 2015-2019 Capital Program. In June 2018, Metro-North announced that they would elect to not exercise their options for the M9 order, instead overhauling their M3A units to extend their lifespan. However, that November, Metro-North stated that they "are working with LIRR to procure 170 new M9A cars in the next Capital Program to provide additional capacity and replace M3As."

Retired rolling stock
Roster rolling stock manufactured from 1946 to the present.

Bar cars
Metro-North Railroad was the last commuter railroad in the United States to operate bar cars, electric MUs equipped with bars that served alcohol. The M2 bar cars were delivered in 1974, and Metro-North has not ordered new ones. The last train which included a bar car left Grand Central for New Haven at 7:34PM on Friday, May 9, 2014.  While there is talk of retrofitting M8 cars with bars, no decision has been reached and no money allocated. On September 13, 2016, Connecticut Governor Dannel Malloy announced that the state would be buying another 60 M8 cars, 10 of which will be "bar cars". However, the bar cars were later dropped, due to cost and train capacity concerns, as well as Metro-North not being willing to handle the bar themselves, wishing for an outside company to run the operation itself.

References

External links

 
Rolling stock of the United States